The 1986 CART PPG Indy Car World Series season was the 8th national championship season of American open wheel racing sanctioned by CART. The season consisted of 17 races, and one non-points exhibition event. Bobby Rahal was the national champion, and the rookie of the year was Chip Robinson. The 1986 Indianapolis 500 was sanctioned by USAC, but counted towards the CART points championship. Bobby Rahal won the Indy 500, and would later become the first driver since 1980 to win Indy and the CART championship in the same season.

The first two races of the season were won by Kevin Cogan (Phoenix) and Michael Andretti (Long Beach), respectively, the first career wins for both drivers on the CART circuit. Rain delayed the Indianapolis 500, postponing it for six days. Bobby Rahal, driving for Truesports, passed Kevin Cogan with two laps to go, and won for car owner Jim Trueman, who was stricken with cancer. Trueman died less than two weeks later.

The season would shape up as a two-man battle between Rahal and Michael Andretti. Andretti won at Milwaukee, which put him in the points lead for the first time. On Father's Day, Andretti was leading on the final lap at Portland. His car ran out of fuel on the final turn of the final lap, and his father Mario beat him to the finish line by 0.07 seconds. It would go down in lore as one of the most shocking finishes in Indy car history, as well as the closest finish in Indy car history on a road course (until 1997).

Rahal was back in victory lane in July, winning the inaugural Molson Indy Toronto, but Michael Andretti still held the points lead. Rahal won four out of five races during a stretch in August and September, and emerged with a 9-point lead in the standings with two races left. Michael Andretti won a key victory at the second-to-last race of the season at Phoenix, while Rahal finished 3rd.

Going into the season finale at Tamiami Park, Rahal held a scant 3-point lead over Andretti. Neither driver was a factor at Miami, and just past the halfway point, Andretti dropped out with a broken halfshaft. Rahal effectively clinched the championship when Andretti dropped out. Roberto Guerrero won the pole and dominated the race, leading the first 111 laps. But on the final lap, his car sputtered and he ran out of fuel. Al Unser Jr. slipped by to steal the victory, his lone win of 1986. Unser Jr. won from 19th starting position, the furthest back any driver had won a CART road/street course race at the time.

Drivers and Teams
The following teams and drivers competed in the 1986 Indy Car World Series season.  All cars used Goodyear tires.

- The number in parenthesis for chassis & engine indicates the round number it was used at.
- The number in parenthesis for car number is the number the car used at the Indianapolis 500, if a different number was used.

Season Summary

Schedule 

 Oval/Speedway
 Dedicated road course
 Temporary street circuit
NC Non-championship event
*The Indianapolis 500 was scheduled for May 25, but postponed due to rain.
**The Miller American 200 in Honor of Rex Mays was scheduled for June 1, but postponed due to the delay of running the Indianapolis 500 on May 31.
***The Road America race was started on September 21, but stopped after a few laps due to rain, the rest was run on October 4.

Race results

Indianapolis was USAC-sanctioned but counted towards the CART title.

Drivers points standings

See also
 1986 Indianapolis 500
 1986 American Racing Series season

References

 
 
 
 

Champ Car seasons
IndyCar